The  Chicago Cardinals season was their 14th in the National Football League. The team failed to improve on their previous year's record of 2–6–2, with only one victory and the worst record in the ten-team league. They failed to qualify for the first scheduled playoff, the 1933 NFL Championship Game.

This was the first season of ownership for attorney Charles Bidwill, who bought the team from Dr. David J. Jones for $50,000.

Schedule

Standings

References

1933
Chicago Cardinals
Chicago